American Epic: The Best of Country is a compilation of early country and folk songs recorded between 1922 and 1934 and released in 2017 to accompany the award-winning American Epic documentary film series. The album was released as a 16-track download and a 12-track vinyl LP.

Background 
The album was compiled by the American Epic film producers and co-writers Allison McGourty, Duke Erikson and director Bernard MacMahon to provide an overview of the country and folk music researched for the documentary series and as a sampler of the music featured on the 5-CD box set American Epic: The Collection.

Compilation 
The download album features 16 songs recorded in the 1920s and 30s and covers a broad range of rural American country and folk music, including female-led Appalachian country from the Carter Family, Texas white country blues from Prince Albert Hunt, an ancient English folk song from Clarence Ashley, a murder ballad from West Virginia coal miner Dick Justice, Kentucky country gospel from Alfred Karnes, a North Carolina mountain ballad from Bascom Lamar Lunsford, an Alabama fiddle reel from the Stripling Brothers, and a Tennessee hoedown by Uncle Dave Macon.

Restoration 
New sound restoration techniques developed for the American Epic film series were utilized to restore the sixteen 1920s and 30s recordings on the album. The 78rpm record transfers were made by sound engineer Nicholas Bergh using reverse engineering techniques garnered from working with the restored first electrical sound recording system from the 1920s in The American Epic Sessions. This was followed by meticulous sound restoration by sound engineers Peter Henderson and Joel Tefteller to reveal greater fidelity, presence and clarity to these 1920s and 1930s recordings than had been heard before. Some of the recordings were repressed from the original metal parts, which the production located whilst researching the films. Henderson explained, “in some cases we were lucky enough to get some metal parts – that’s the originals where they were cut to wax and the metal was put into the grooves and the discs were printed from those back in the ‘20s. Some of those still exist – Sony had some of them in their vaults.”

Release 
The album was released on June 16, 2017, seventeen days after the US broadcast of the American Epic documentary films. The album was issued as a download, and on a truncated and completely re-sequenced vinyl LP which featured a song not available on the download – Eck Robertson's 1922 recording of “Sallie Gooden”.

Critical reception 
Robert Christgau in Noisey awarded the download album an B+ grade, stating “for me, this might well replace Legacy's White Country Blues whenever I need reminding that the Trumper-spawning white supremacists who lost the Civil War had their moments of blessed foolishness, bemused melancholy, and supernal grace.” The restoration work was described by Greil Marcus in The Village Voice as “re-mastering I can only call profound. Performances you might think you knew sound as if you’ve never heard them before — never apprehended them.” Robert Baird in Stereophile added that “what's most interesting for audiophiles is the huge improvement in the quality of the sound coming from these 78 transfers.” Ian Anderson in fRoots, reviewing the restoration, wrote “you haven’t really heard these tracks at all. Not like this. Forget bad dubs of worn-out 78s pressed on poor vinyl. The ‘reverse engineering’ transfers by Nicholas Bergh and subsequent restorations are so startlingly better, practically everything you will ever have experienced from this era can be discounted and CD is the best way to hear them. The clarity of group recordings where every instrument is well defined, and of solo artists where their instruments and voices suddenly sound real, will have you on the edge of your seat. And there's none of that fog of 78 surface noise which many people find too much of a distraction: suddenly, legendary artists are in the room with you”.

Track listing

Digital download

LP

Personnel 
(download edition)

 Sara Carter: vocal, autoharp (track 1)
 Maybelle Carter: vocal, guitar (track 1)
 A. P. Carter: vocal (track 1)
 Charlie Poole: vocal, banjo (track 2)
 Odell Smith: fiddle (track 2)
 Roy Harvey: guitar (track 2)
 Clarence Ashley: banjo, vocal (track 3)
 Jimmie Rodgers: vocal (disc 4)
 C. L. Hutchison: cornet (disc 4)
 James Rickard: clarinet (disc 4)
 John Westbrook: steel guitar (disc 4)
 Dean Bryan: guitar (disc 4)
 George MacMillan: string bass (disc 4)
 Dick Justice: vocal, guitar (track 5)
 Uncle Dave Macon: vocal, banjo (track 6)
 Sam McGee: guitar, vocal (track 6)
 Kirk McGee: fiddle, vocal (track 6)
 Mazy Todd: fiddle (track 6)
 Bascom Lamar Lunsford: vocal, banjo (track 7)
 Frank Hutchison: vocals, guitar, harmonica (track 8)
 Dock Walsh: banjo, vocal (track 9)
 Clarence Ashley: guitar, vocal (track 9)
 Garley Foster: harmonica, guitar (track 9)
 Archie ‘Prince’ Albert Hunt: fiddle, vocal (track 10)
 Oscar Harper: guitar (track 10)
 Leonard Rutherford: fiddle (track 11)
 Richard D. Burnett: banjo, vocal effect (track 11)
 Dock Boggs: vocal, banjo (track 12)
 Curt Massey: fiddle (track 13)
 Larry Wellington: accordion, piano (track 13)
 Milt Mabie: string bass (track 13)
 Alfred G. Karnes: vocal, guitar (track 14)
 Earl Johnson: fiddle, vocal (track 15)
 Emmett Bankston: banjo, vocal (track 15)
 Lee ‘Red’ Henderson: guitar (track 15)
 Charles Stripling: fiddle (track 16)
 Ira Stripling: guitar (track 16)
 Bernard MacMahon - editor, compiler, producer
 Nicholas Bergh - 78rpm transfers, mastering
 Peter Henderson - restoration, mastering, producer
 Duke Erikson - restoration, mastering, producer
 Joel Tefteller - restoration, mastering
 John Polito - mastering
 Ellis Burman - mastering
 Allison McGourty - producer
 Adam Block - producer
 Patrick Ferris - associate producer
 Jack McLean - associate producer
 Nat Strimpopulos: artwork

References

Notes

Bibliography 
 Wald, Elijah & McGourty, Allison & MacMahon, Bernard. American Epic: The First Time America Heard Itself. New York: Touchstone, 2017. .

External links 
 Official American Epic website

Folk albums by American artists
2017 compilation albums
Folk compilation albums
Compilation albums by American artists
Country music compilation albums
Country albums by American artists
American Epic albums
Third Man Records compilation albums
Legacy Recordings compilation albums
LO-MAX Records albums